Alternative for Germany (AfD) is a right-wing populist political party in Germany. AfD is known for its Euroskepticism, it also opposes  immigration to Germany. The AfD's ideology is positioned on the radical right, a subset of the far-right, within the family of European political parties.

Established in April 2013, AfD narrowly missed the 5% electoral threshold to sit in the Bundestag during the 2013 German federal election. The party won seven seats in the 2014 European Parliament election in Germany as a member of the European Conservatives and Reformists (ECR). After securing representation in 14 of the 16 German state parliaments by October 2017, AfD won 94 seats in the 2017 German federal election and became the third largest party in the country as well as the largest opposition party; its lead candidates were co-vice chairman Alexander Gauland and Alice Weidel, the latter having served as the party group leader in the 19th Bundestag. In the 2021 German federal election, AfD dropped to the fifth largest party.

AfD was founded by Gauland, Bernd Lucke, and former members of the Christian Democratic Union of Germany (CDU) to oppose the policies of the Eurozone as a right-wing and moderately Eurosceptic alternative to the centre-right but pro-European CDU. The party presented itself as an economic liberal, soft Eurosceptic, and conservative movement in its early years. AfD has subsequently moved further to the right, and expanded its policies under successive leaderships to include opposition to immigration, Islam, and the European Union. After 2015, AfD has often been characterized as an anti-Islam, anti-immigration, German nationalist, national-conservative, and a Eurosceptic party. The AfD is the only party represented in the German Bundestag whose environmental and climate policy is based on the denial of human-caused climate change.

Several state associations and other factions of AfD have been linked to or accused of harboring connections with far-right nationalist and proscribed movements, such as PEGIDA, the Neue Rechte and Identitarian movements, and of employing historical revisionist and xenophobic rhetoric. They have been observed by various state offices for the protection of the constitution since 2018. AfD's leadership has denied that the party is racist and has been internally divided on whether to endorse such groups. In January 2022 however, party leader Jörg Meuthen resigned his party chairmanship with immediate effect and left the AfD, as according to him the party had developed very far to the right with totalitarian traits and in large parts was no longer based on the free-democratic basic order.

In March 2021, most of Germany's major media outlets reported that the Federal Office for the Protection of the Constitution (BfV) had placed AfD under surveillance as a suspected extremist group. Shortly after this announcement, surveillance of AfD was blocked by the courts to give equal opportunities among political parties in a key election year.
In 2022, it was ruled that the BfV may classify and monitor the entire party as a suspected right-wing extremist group. A corresponding lawsuit by the AfD was dismissed, because "there were sufficient factual indications of anti-constitutional efforts within the AfD".

History

Founding 
In September 2012, Alexander Gauland, Bernd Lucke, and journalist Konrad Adam founded the political group Electoral Alternative 2013 in Bad Nauheim, to oppose German federal policies concerning the eurozone crisis, and to confront German-supported bailouts for poorer southern European countries. Their manifesto was endorsed by several economists, journalists, and business leaders, and stated that the eurozone had proven to be "unsuitable" as a currency area and that southern European states were "sinking into poverty under the competitive pressure of the euro".

Some candidates of what would become AfD sought election in Lower Saxony as part of the Electoral Alternative 2013 in alliance with the Free Voters, an association participating in local elections without specific federal or foreign policies, and received 1% of the vote. In February 2013, the group decided to found a new party to compete in the 2013 federal election; according to a leaked email from Lucke, the Free Voters leadership declined to join forces. Advocating the abolition of the euro, AfD took a more radical stance than the Free Voters. The Pirate Party Germany opposed any coalition with AfD at their 2013 spring convention.

The AfD's initial supporters were the same prominent economists, business leaders, and journalists who had supported the Electoral Alternative 2013, including former members of the Christian Democratic Union of Germany (CDU), who had previously challenged the constitutionality of the German government's eurozone policies at the Federal Constitutional Court. AfD did not regard itself as a splinter party from the CDU, as its early membership also contained a former state leader from the Free Democratic Party and members of the Federation of Independent Voters, a pressure group of independents and small business owners.

On 14 April 2013, the AfD announced its presence to the wider public when it held its first convention in Berlin, elected the party leadership, and adopted a party platform. Bernd Lucke, entrepreneur Frauke Petry and Konrad Adam were elected as speakers. AfD's federal board also chose Alexander Gauland, Roland Klaus, and Patricia Casale as its three deputy speakers. The party elected treasurer Norbert Stenzel and the three assessors Irina Smirnova, Beatrix Diefenbach, and Wolf-Joachim Schünemann. Economist Joachim Starbatty, along with Jörn Kruse, Helga Luckenbach, Dirk Meyer, and Roland Vaubel, were elected to the party's scientific advisory board. Between 31 March and 12 May 2013, AfD founded affiliates in all 16 German states in order to participate in the federal elections. On 15 June 2013, the Young Alternative for Germany was founded in Darmstadt as the AfD's youth organisation. During the British prime minister David Cameron's visit to Germany in April 2013, the Conservative Party was reported to have contacted both AfD and the Free Voters to discuss possible cooperation, supported by the European Conservatives and Reformists (ECR) group of the European Parliament. In June 2013, Bernd Lucke gave a question and answer session organised by the Conservative Party-allied Bruges Group think tank in Portcullis House, London. In a detailed report in the conservative Frankfurter Allgemeine Zeitung in April 2013, the paper's Berlin-based political correspondent Majid Sattar revealed that the SPD and CDU had conducted opposition research to blunt the growth and attraction of AfD.

2013 federal election 

On 22 September 2013, AfD won 4.7% of the votes in the 2013 federal election, just missing the 5% barrier to enter the Bundestag. The party won about 2 million party list votes and 810,000 constituency votes, which was 1.9% of the total of these votes cast across Germany.

2013 state elections 
AfD did not participate in the 2013 Bavaria state election held on 15 September. AfD gained its first representation in the state parliament of Hesse with the defection of Jochen Paulus from the Free Democratic Party (FDP) to AfD in early May 2013; he was not re-elected and left office in January 2014. In the 2013 Hesse state election held on 22 September, the same day as the 2013 federal election, AfD failed to gain representation in the parliament with 4.0% of the vote.

2014 European Parliament election 

In early 2014, the Federal Constitutional Court of Germany ruled the proposed 3% vote hurdle for representation in the European elections unconstitutional, and the 2014 European Parliament election became the first run in Germany without a barrier for representation.

AfD held a party conference on 25 January 2014 at Frankenstolz Arena, Aschaffenburg, northwest Bavaria. The conference chose the slogan Mut zu Deutschland ("Courage [to stand up] for Germany") to replace the former slogan Mut zur Wahrheit (lit. "Courage [to speak] the truth", or more succinctly, "Telling it as it is"), which prompted disagreement among the federal board that the party could be seen as too anti-European. A compromise was reached by using the slogan "MUT ZU D*EU*TSCHLAND", with the "EU" in "DEUTSCHLAND" encircled by the 12 stars of the European flag. The conference elected the top six candidates for the European elections on 26 January 2014 and met again the following weekend to choose the remaining euro candidates. Candidates from 7th–28th place on the party list were selected in Berlin on 1 February. Party chairman Bernd Lucke was elected as lead candidate.

In February 2014, AfD officials said they had discussed alliances with Britain's anti-EU UK Independence Party (UKIP), which Lucke and the federal board of AfD opposed, and also with the European Conservatives and Reformists (ECR) group, to which Britain's Conservative Party belongs. In April 2014, Hans-Olaf Henkel, AfD's second candidate on the European election list, ruled out forming a group with the UKIP. stating that he saw the Conservatives as the preferred partner in the European Parliament. On 10 May 2014, Lucke had been in talks with the Czech and Polish member parties of the ECR group.

In the 2014 European Parliament election on 25 May, AfD came in fifth place in Germany, with 7.1% of the national vote (2,065,162 votes), and seven Members of the European parliament (MEPs). On 12 June 2014, it was announced that AfD had been accepted into the ECR group in the European Parliament. The official vote result was not released to the public, but figures of 29 votes for and 26 against were reported by the membership. The inclusion of AfD in the ECR group was said to have caused mild tensions between the German chancellor Angela Merkel and the British prime minister David Cameron.

2014 state elections 
On 31 August, AfD scored 9.7% of the vote in the 2014 Saxony state election, winning 14 seats in the Landtag of Saxony. On 14 September, AfD obtained 10.6% of the vote in the 2014 Thuringian and 12.2% in the Brandenburg state election, winning 11 seats in both state parliaments.

2015 state elections 
On 15 February, AfD won 6.1% of the vote in the 2015 Hamburg state election, gaining the mandate for eight seats in the Hamburg Parliament, winning their first seats in a western German state.

On 10 May, AfD secured in the 5.5% of the vote in the 2015 Bremen state election gaining representation in their fifth state parliament on a 50% turnout.

Petry assumes leadership and Lucke quits 
After months of factional infighting and a cancelled party gathering in June 2015, Frauke Petry was elected on 4 July 2015 as the de facto principal speaker of the party with 60% of the member votes ahead of Bernd Lucke at a party congress in Essen. Petry was a member of the national-conservative faction of AfD. Her leadership was widely seen as heralding a shift of the party to the right to focus more on issues such as migration, Islam, and strengthening ties to Russia, a shift which was claimed by Lucke as turning the party into a "Pegida party". In the following week, five MEPs exited the party on 7 July, the only remaining MEPs being Beatrix von Storch and Marcus Pretzell, and Lucke announced on 8 July 2015 that he was resigning from AfD, citing the rise of xenophobic and pro-Russian sentiments in the party. At a meeting of members of the Wake-up call (Weckruf 2015) group on 19 July 2015, AfD founder Bernd Lucke and former AfD members announced they would form a new party, the Alliance for Progress and Renewal, under the founding principles of AfD.

Co-operation with FPÖ and exclusion from ECR group 
In February 2016, AfD announced a cooperation pact with the Freedom Party of Austria (FPÖ). On 8 March 2016, the bureau of the ECR group began motions to exclude AfD from their group due to its links with the far-right FPÖ, inviting the two remaining AfD MEPs to leave the group by 31 March, with a motion of exclusion to be tabled on 12 April if they refuse to leave voluntarily. While MEP Beatrix von Storch left the ECR group on 8 April to join the Europe of Freedom and Direct Democracy group, Marcus Pretzell let himself be expelled on 12 April 2016.

2016 state elections 
With the European migrant crisis remaining the dominant national issue, elections on 13 March were held in the three states of Baden-Württemberg, Rhineland-Palatinate, and Saxony-Anhalt, and saw the AfD receiving double-digit percentages of the vote in all three states. In the 2016 Saxony-Anhalt state election, AfD reached second place in the Landtag, receiving 24.2% of the vote. In the 2016 Baden-Württemberg state election, AfD achieved third place, with 15.1% of the vote. In the 2016 Rhineland-Palatinate state election, AfD again reached third place, with 12.6% of the vote. In Angela Merkel's home state of Mecklenburg-Vorpommern, her CDU was beaten into third place following a strong showing of AfD, who contested at state level for the first time, to claim the second-highest polling with 20.8% of the vote in the 2016 Mecklenburg-Vorpommern state election. AfD voter support in Mecklenburg-Western Pomerania appears to have come from both left-wing and right-wing parties, with support for the Social Democratic Party of Germany down 4.9%, CDU down 4.1%, The Left down 5.2%, Alliance '90/The Greens down 3.9%, and support for the National Democratic Party of Germany (NDP) halved, dropping to 3.0%. Rising support for AfD meant that The Greens and the NDP failed to reach the 5% threshold to qualify for seats in the Landtag of Mecklenburg-Vorpommern, and consequently lost their seats. In the 2016 Berlin state election, which AfD also contested for the first time, the party achieved a vote of 14.2%, making them the fifth largest party represented in the state assembly. Their vote seems to have come equally from the SPD and CDU, whose votes declined 6.7% and 5.7%, respectively.

2016 party congress 
At the party congress held on 30 April to 1 May 2016, AfD adopted a policy platform based upon opposition to Islam, calling for the ban of Islamic symbols including burqas, minarets, and adhan (call to prayer), using the slogan "Islam is not a part of Germany".

2017 federal election

At the party conference in April 2017, Frauke Petry announced that she would not run as the party's main candidate for the 2017 federal election. This announcement grew out of internal power struggle as the party's support had fallen in polls from 15% in the summer of 2016 to 7% just before the conference. Björn Höcke from the far-right wing of the party and Petry were attempting to push each other out of the party. Petry's decision was partly seen as a step to avoid a vote at the conference on the issue of her standing. The party chose Alexander Gauland, a stark conservative who worked as an editor and was a former member of the CDU, to lead the party in the elections. Gauland supported the retention of Höcke's party membership. Alice Weidel, who is perceived as more moderate and neoliberal, was elected as his running mate. The party approved a platform that, according to The Wall Street Journal, "urges Germany to close its borders to asylum applicants, end sanctions on Russia and to leave the EU if Berlin fails to retrieve national sovereignty from Brussels, as well as to amend the country's constitution to allow people born to non-German parents to have their German citizenship revoked if they commit serious crimes."

In the 2017 federal election, AfD won 12.6% of the vote and received 94 seats; this was the first time it had won seats in the Bundestag. It won three constituency seats, which would have been enough to qualify for proportionally-elected seats in any event. Under a long-standing law intended to benefit regional parties, any party that wins at least three constituency seats qualifies for its share of proportionally-elected seats, regardless of vote share.

Split-off parties
At a press conference held by AfD the day after the 2017 federal election, Frauke Petry said that she would participate in the Bundestag as an independent; she said she did this because extremist statements by some members made it impossible for AfD to function as a constructive opposition, and to make clear to voters that there is internal dissent in the AfD. She also said that she would be leaving the party at some future date. Petry formed the Blue Party in September 2017. Four members of AfD in the Mecklenburg-Western Pomerania legislature, including Bernhard Wild, also left the party to form Citizens for Mecklenburg-Vorpommern, which folded in December 2018. On 6 November 2019, Petry announced that the Blue Party would dissolve by the end of the year 

In 2018, André Poggenburg, AfD's regional leader of the eastern Saxony-Anhalt state, resigned his post after making racist remarks concerning Turks and immigrants with dual citizenship. Poggenburg gave as reasons for his resignation a shift to the left in AfD when it jettisoned from extremists in order to appear more moderate to voters. In 2019, Poggenburg started a new far-right party, Aufbruch deutscher Patrioten – Mitteldeutschland, which planned to field candidates in state elections in Saxony, Thuringia, and Brandenburg in Fall 2019. In August 2019, party founder Poggenburg left AdP because his internal call to support AfD in the upcoming state elections of fall 2019 was denied.

2021 federal election 

Ahead of the 2021 federal election, AfD campaigned with the slogan "Germany. But Normal", and took a position of opposing further lockdowns in response to the COVID-19 pandemic in Germany. Having moved further right on economic issues and remaining strongly right on socio-cultural issues, despite attempts to normalize, AfD's manifesto for the federal election was deemed to be still too radical for the party to take part in government.

In the federal election, AfD saw a dip in national vote share by getting 10.3% of the vote, compared to 12.6% in 2017; however, the party emerged as the largest in the states of Saxony and Thuringia, and saw a strong performance in eastern Germany. The party's results drew a mixed analysis from AfD members and political commentators, the latter of whom attributed the slight decline to visible infighting, whereas AfD candidates such as Alice Weidel blamed media bias against the party. Political scientist Kai Arzheimer commented that the result "wasn't any appreciable increase, but it wasn't a disaster for them." Arzheimer also posited that the result demonstrated that AfD had firmly established itself in German national politics but had not reached beyond its core support. AfD's top candidates Tino Chrupalla and Weidel praised the result as "solid", while party spokesman Jörg Meuthen stated that the party should reevaluate the result and aim on "sending strong signals towards the center" to win back new voters. Meuthen left the party in January 2022.

2022 and 2023 state elections 
AfD held their three seats in the 2022 Saarland state election but lost all their seats in the 2022 Schleswig-Holstein state election. In the 2022 Lower Saxony state election in October the AfD won 9 more seats compared to 2017 to a total of 18. In the 2023 Berlin repeat state election, the AfD recorded a small upswing by gaining 4 seats compared to the 2021 election.

Ideology and policies 

The AfD is broadly considered to be a right wing and national conservative movement in both socioeconomic and sociocultural terms. AfD's policy brief and mission statement seeks to define the party as both liberal and conservative, with an emphasis on protecting sovereignty, Western identity, and German culture in what it calls a "peaceful, democratic and sovereign nation-state of the German people."  Political scientists and journalists have also described the AfD as synonymous with opposition to immigration, Euroscepticism, and holding a nationalist bent, with various shades of German nationalism from civic nationalism to hardline sentiments visible in the party. Other commentators have categorized it as a radical right populist party or as "a typical radical right-wing populist party", with an emphasis on nativism.  Within its elected representation and grassroots membership, AfD has grown to contain interparty factions that range from more moderate conservatives to radicals.

AfD was initially founded as a liberal conservative party of the middle class with a tendency toward soft Euroscepticism, being supportive of Germany's membership in the European Union but critical of further European integration, the existence of the euro currency and the bailouts by the Eurozone for countries such as Greece. At that time, the party also advocated support for Swiss-style semi-direct democracy, major reforms to the Eurozone, opposition to immigration, and opposed same-sex marriage. During this period, the party espoused economic liberal, ordoliberal, and national liberal policy stances. Former party MEP Hans-Olaf Henkel likened AfD's early platform to the Conservative Party in Britain rather than hard Eurosceptic or nationalist parties such as the UK Independence Party or the National Front in France. AfD was also compared to the Tea Party movement by some media outlets due to its campaigns against Eurozone bailouts, although AfD's early leadership disputed this and said it was not looking to attract right-wing extremists into the party.

In 2015, more moderate members, including founder and former chairman Bernd Lucke, left AfD after Frauke Petry was elected chairperson to found a new party, the Alliance for Progress and Renewal, which was renamed the Liberal Conservative Reformers in November 2016. At that time, AfD was performing poorly in opinion polls, polling at around 3 percent, and was suffering infighting; however, an influx of refugees and migrants boosted their support later in 2015, with the party turning from matters related to the Eurozone to focus on opposing migration, in particular Muslims and Muslim immigration.

AfD underwent a further shift to the right after Petry left the party in 2017 and formed The Blue Party, following AfD's adoption of more hardline Islamophobic, anti-immigration positions, and historical revisionist remarks by leading AfD figures. The party now resembles other populist radical right parties in Europe but is somewhat unusual because it maintains visible ties to even more extreme groups. AfD has been described as, and accused of, containing members sympathetic to the Identitarian movement and Pegida. The AfD leadership has been split on whether to embrace these movements within the party.

In March 2020, the Federal Office for the Protection of the Constitution classified AfD's far-right nationalistic faction known as Der Flügel as "a right-wing extremist endeavor against the free democratic basic order" and as "not compatible with the Basic Law", placing it under intelligence surveillance. In early March 2021, most of Germany's major media outlets reported that the Bundesverfassungsschutz had placed the whole AfD under surveillance as a "suspected extremist group". In response to claims from AfD members that the move was intended to damage the party's chances in the 2021 German federal election, the agency stated it would not make public announcements regarding investigations into the AfD or its candidates for the foreseeable future.

Ideological factions
Political commentators and analysts have described the party as containing two prominent factions: subscribers to more moderate right-wing and national-conservative policies, such as parliamentarians Jörg Meuthen, Alice Weidel, and Beatrix von Storch, and the more hardline identitarian Der Flügel wing, comprising figures at state level such as Thuringia state leader Björn Höcke. Political author Jeffrey Gedmin has described the present incarnation of AfD as somewhat lacking in a consistent ideological vision and containing a broad church of members who are conservatives, social conservatives, radical-rightists, and others who do not present clear ideological narrative. He also described some of its core voter support as ranging from far-right nationalists to moderate but traditionalist and disaffected conservatives. The two most dominant factions of the AfD have been noted as the Der Flügel and the more dovish and moderate national-conservative Alternative Mitte (Alternative Midpoint).

Economic policies 
AfD is an economic liberal party. Despite the 2015 split of economic liberals, AfD can still be broadly characterized as neoliberal on economic terms, emphasizing deregulation and much limited state intervention. Attempts of some factions to emphasize small and medium-sized enterprises, and advocate protectionism over free trade, did not have much success or changes in party policies.

German nationalism 
Over time, a focus on German nationalism, on reclaiming Germany's sovereignty and national pride, especially in repudiation of Germany's culture of shame with regard to its Nazi past, became more central in AfD's ideology and a central plank in its populist appeals. Petry, who led the moderate wing of the party, said that Germany should reclaim völkisch from its Nazi connotations, while Björn Höcke, who is an example of the more right-wing or national conservative ideology, regularly speaks of the Vaterland ("father land") and Volk ("nation" or "people", but with a strong ethnic or racial connotation).

In January 2017, Höcke in a speech stated, in reference to the Berlin Holocaust Memorial, that "Germans are the only people in the world who plant a monument of shame in the heart of the capital" and criticized this "laughable policy of coming to terms with the past". Höcke continued that Germany should make a "180 degree" turn with regard to its sense of national pride.

Circumcision 
AfD supports a ban on circumcision for non-medical reasons for those under the age of majority, saying that the practice composes a "serious violations of fundamental rights".

Immigration, multiculturalism and Islam 

AfD describes German national identity as under threat both from European integration and from the presence and accommodation of immigrants and refugees within Germany. Former leader Petry said in March 2016: "I'm not against immigration, but ... the economic and social consequences of migration on both home and host countries are equally momentous ... The immigration of so many Muslims will change our culture. If this change is desired, it must be the product of a democratic decision supported by a broad majority. But Ms. Merkel simply opened the borders and invited everybody in, without consulting the parliament or the people."

In its program, AfD wants to end what it describes as mass immigration and focus on taking in small numbers of skilled immigrants who are expected to integrate into society and speak German. It encourages German nationals to have more children, as opposed to trying to boost the German population through foreign migration. The party wants to review EU freedom of movement rules and states that immigrants must be employed and contribute to social security through paying taxes for at least four years before being allowed to receive state benefits. AfD calls for mass deportation of foreign born criminals with multiple citizenship or permanent residency. The party describes the Geneva Convention on Refugees as "outdated", calls for stricter vetting of refugees, and believes the German government should invest in special economic and safe zones in third world nations as opposed to taking in large numbers of asylum seekers without background checks.

AfD is critical of multiculturalism in Germany, stating that "the concept of a multi-cultural society has failed." The party favours banning the burqa, the Islamic call to prayer in public areas and the construction of new minarets, ending foreign funding of mosques and putting imams through a state vetting procedure.

The AfD began to employ anti-Muslim rhetoric during the leadership of Frauke Petry, who responded positively to comparisons between the party and Pegida. In 2016 the party adopted several anti-Muslim positions, and stated in its manifesto that "Islam does not belong to Germany. Its expansion and the ever-increasing number of Muslims in the country are viewed by the AfD as a danger to our state, our society, and our values." The party has run a poster campaign that explicitly referenced the Eurabia thesis, and the party has been seen to have been strongly influenced by, and to be a part of the counter-jihad movement.

Ritual slaughter 
AfD is supportive of a ban on kosher slaughter within the country, as well as the "import and sale of kosher meat".

Homosexuality and feminism 
According to its interim electoral manifesto, AfD is against same-sex marriage and favours civil unions. The left-leaning newspaper Die Tageszeitung described the group as advocating "old gender roles". Wolfgang Gedeon, an elected AfD representative, has included feminism, along with "sexualism" and "migrationism", in an ideology he calls "green communism" that he opposes, and argues for family values as part of German identity. As AfD has campaigned for traditional roles for women, it has aligned itself with groups opposed to modern feminism. The youth wing of the party has used social media to campaign against aspects of modern feminism, with the support of party leadership.  Alice Weidel, a prominent leader in the party, is a lesbian and is in a civil union with a female Sri Lankan-born Swiss film producer. Weidel has two adopted children with her partner.

Environment and climate change 
AfD has a platform that is skeptical of what it considers climate propaganda. The AfD accepts that the climate is changing, however, it denies that this change is attributable to human influences. Instead, the party argues that climate change is entirely caused by natural factors. The AfD argues that the rising carbon dioxide concentrations have been beneficial (contributed to a "greening" of our planet). Next to its climate change denial, the AfD opposes far-reaching climate policies: The party opposes energy transformation policies (Energiewende), wants to scrap the German Renewable Energy Act, the German Energy Saving Regulations, and the German Renewable Energy Heat Act. They also want to end bioenergy subsidies and restrict "uncontrolled expansion of wind energy". The party argues that the energy transition threatenes energy security, possibly leading to energy blackouts. It, therefore, views lignite as the only native energy source that can guarantee German energy security and energy self-sufficiency. Furthermore, the AfD wants to reinstate Germany's nuclear plants, arguing that closures between 2002 and 2011 were "economically damaging and not objectively justified". The party argues that the government should "allow a lifetime extension of still operating nuclear power plants on a transitional basis".

Conscription 
AfD wants a reinstatement of conscription in Germany, starting for men at the age of 18.

Foreign policy 

AfD is pro-NATO, pro-United States, and pro-Israel but is significantly divided on whether to support Russia, and has opposed sanctions on Russia supported by NATO and the United States. It is also divided on free-trade agreements. In March 2019, party leader Alexander Gauland said in an interview with the Russian newspaper Komsomolskaya Pravda that they consider the War in Donbas to be a Ukrainian internal matter, and that Germany should not get involved in the internal affairs of Ukraine or Russia. He also said the AfD is against Western sanctions imposed on Russia.

AfD initially held a position of soft Euroscepticism by opposing the euro currency and Eurozone bailouts, which the party saw as undermining European integration, but it was otherwise supportive of German membership of the European Union (EU). Since 2015, the party has shifted to a more purely Eurosceptic and nationalist position against the EU, calling for the withdrawal from the common European asylum and security policy, significant reform of the EU and a repatriation of powers back from Brussels with some party members endorsing a complete exit from the European Union if it these aims are not achievable. During the 2021 party conference in Dresden, a majority of AfD members voted to include more hardline policies against the European Union including German withdrawal from the bloc in the party's manifesto ahead of the 2021 German federal election.

AfD supported the decision of US president Donald Trump to recognize Jerusalem as Israel's capital, as stated by AfD's Petr Bystron. Despite AfD's pro-Israel stance, the State of Israel has boycotted the party and refuses to hold ties with AfD.

The AfD is considered a key ally for the International Agency for Current Policy in an OCCRP investigation from February 2023. The report accuses Manuel Ochsenreiter of having received payments for publishing pro-russian propaganda in his Zuerst! magazine.

Organization

Membership

Party finances 

Because the 2013 federal election was the first attempt to join by the party, AfD had not received any federal funds in the run-up to it; by receiving 2 million votes, it crossed the threshold for party funding and was expected to receive an estimated 1.3 to 1.5 million euros per year of state subsidies. After joining the parliament with more than 90 representatives in the 2017 federal election, the party received more than 70 million euros per year; this probably rose to more than 100 million euros per year from 2019 onward. The party has also established and acknowledged a foundation for political education, and other purposes, close to the party but organized separately, which may be able to claim up to 80 million euro per year. This foundation would need to be acknowledged by the federal parliament in Germany first, but it has a legal claim to these subsidies.

In 2018, the Alternative for Germany donation scandal became public, as federal and European Parliament politicians Alice Weidel, Jörg Meuthen, Marcus Pretzell, and Guido Reil had profited from illegal and unnamed donations from non-EU countries. The acceptance of donations from non-EU countries is prohibited for German parties and politicians.

European affiliations 
Following the 2014 European Parliament election on 12 June, AfD was accepted into the European Conservatives and Reformists (ECR) group in the European Parliament.

In February 2016, AfD announced a closer cooperation with the right-wing populist party Freedom Party of Austria (FPÖ), which is a member of the Europe of Nations and Freedom (ENF) group. On 8 March 2016, the bureau of the ECR group began motions to exclude AfD MEPs from their group due to the party's links with the far-right FPÖ and controversial remarks by two party leader about shooting immigrants. MEP Beatrix von Storch pre-empted her imminent expulsion by leaving the ECR group to join the Europe of Freedom and Direct Democracy group on 8 April, and Marcus Pretzell was expelled from the ECR group on 12 April 2016. During the party convention on 30 April 2016, Pretzell announced his intention to join the Europe of Nations and Freedom group, although he subsequently left AfD to join Petry's Blue Party.

In April 2019, Jörg Meuthen appeared alongside Northern League leader Matteo Salvini, National Rally leader Marine Le Pen, and politicians from the Danish People's Party and FPÖ to announce the formation of a new European political alliance. AfD later joined this group in the European Parliament, which was ultimately named the Identity and Democracy group.

Beyond Identity and Democracy, the AfD also has ties to parties such as the Hungarian Our Homeland Movement, the Slovak Republic party, and the Serbian Dveri.

Public image

Early days 
At the outset, AfD presented itself as conservative and middle-class, catering to a well-educated demographic; around two-thirds of supporters listed on its website in the early days held doctorates, leading to AfD being nicknamed the "professors' party" in those early days. The party was described as professors and academics who dislike the compromises inflicted on their purist theories by German party politics. 86% of the party's initial supporters were male.

Relationship with right-wing groups 

Outside the Berlin hotel where the party held its inaugural meeting, it has been alleged that copies of Junge Freiheit, a weekly that is also popular with the far right, were being handed out. The Rheinische Post pointed out that some AfD members and supporters write for the conservative paper. There was also a protest outside the venue of the party's inaugural meeting by Andreas Storr, a National Democratic Party of Germany (NPD) representative in the Landtag of Saxony, as the NPD sees AfD as a rival for Eurosceptic votes.

In 2013, AfD party organisers sent out the message that they are not trying to attract right-wing radicals, and toned down rhetoric on their Facebook page following media allegations that it too closely evoked the language of the far right. At that time, AfD checked applicants for membership to exclude far-right and former NPD members who support the anti-euro policy. The former party chairman Bernd Lucke stated that "[t]he applause is coming from the wrong side", in regards to praise his party gained from the NPD.

Members of Alliance 90/Green Party have accused AfD of pandering to xenophobic and nationalistic sentiments. There have been altercations between AfD members and Green Youth members. Following the 2013 federal election 2013, the anti-Islam German Freedom Party unilaterally pledged to support AfD in the 2014 elections and concentrate its efforts on local elections only. Bernd Lucke responded by saying that the German Freedom Party's support was unwanted and sent a letter to AfD party associations recommending a hiring freeze.

Stern reported that among 396 AfD candidates for the 2017 Bundestag, 47 candidates did not distance themselves from right-wing extremism. Although a large proportion of the candidates are not openly racist, some relativize Germany's role in World War II or call for the recognition of a "Cult of Guilt". 30 candidates claimed to tolerate right-wing friends in their profile or were themselves members of groups associated with such people; others said that they mourned the German Reich or used their symbols.

Opposition to same-sex marriage 
AfD deputy leader Beatrix von Storch has publicly opposed same-sex marriage. In an effort to overturn same-sex marriage laws, AfD filed a lawsuit over the issue in 2017.

Refugees
In 2016, AfD MEP Marcus Pretzell was expelled from the party after he said that German borders should be defended from incursion by refugees "with armed force as a measure of last resort". Later that same year, former AfD party chair and MEP Frauke Petry told a reporter from the regional newspaper Mannheimer Morgen that the German Border police must do their jobs by "hindering illegal entry of refugees" and that they may "use firearms if necessary" to "prevent illegal border crossings". Petry later stated that no policeman "wants to fire on a refugee and I don't want that either" but that border police must follow the law to maintain the integrity of European borders. Afterwards, Petry made several attempts to justify these statements.

Pegida 
In response to the Pegida movement and demonstrations, members of AfD have expressed different opinions of it, with Lucke describing the movement as "a sign that these people do not feel their concerns are understood by politicians". In response to the CDU Interior Minister Thomas de Maizière alleging an "overlap" between Pegida rallies and AfD, Alexander Gauland stated that AfD are "natural allies of this movement". Hans-Olaf Henkel asked members of the party not to join the demonstrations, telling Der Tagesspiegel that he believed it could not be ruled out that they had "xenophobic or even racist connotations". A straw poll by The Economist found that nine out of ten Pegida protesters would back the AfD.

Anti-communism 
AfD is anti-communist and engaged in red-baiting by comparing the centre-right Angela Merkel and her government to the secret police in East Germany. In May 2018, a statue of the founding father of communism Karl Marx, donated by the Chinese government, was unveiled in Marx's hometown of Trier. AfD leader Alexander Gauland said the city should not accept the statue, saying that it disrespects victims of communism. AfD staged a silent march to remember the victims of communist regimes.

Memorial to the Murdered Jews of Europe 
In January 2017, Björn Höcke, one of the founders of AfD, gave a speech in Dresden in which, referring to the Memorial to the Murdered Jews of Europe, he stated that "we Germans are the only people in the world who have planted a memorial of shame in the heart of their capital", and suggested that Germans "need to make a 180 degree change in their politics of commemoration". The speech was widely criticized as antisemitic, among others by Jewish leaders in Germany. Within AfD, he was described by his party chairwoman, Frauke Petry, as a "burden to the party", while other members of the party, such as Alexander Gauland, said that they found no antisemitism in the speech.

In February 2017, AfD leaders asked for Höcke to be expelled from the party due to his speech. The arbitration committee of AfD in Thuringia was set to rule on the leaders' request. In May 2018 an AfD tribunal ruled that Höcke was allowed to stay in the party.

Young Alternative for Germany 

Young Alternative for Germany (JA) was founded in 2013 as the youth organisation of AfD, while remaining legally independent from its mother party. In view of JA's independence, it has been regarded by some in AfD's hierarchy as being somewhat wayward, with JA repeatedly accused of being "too far-right", politically regressive and antifeminist by the German mainstream media.

Election results

Federal Parliament (Bundestag)

European Parliament

State parliaments (Landtage)

See also 
 Alliance for Germany

References

Notes

Citations

Further reading
 Arzheimer, Kai, and Carl C. Berning. "How the alternative for Germany (AfD) and their voters veered to the radical right, 2013–2017." Electoral Studies 60 (2019): 102040.
 Berbuir, Nicole, Marcel Lewandowsky, and Jasmin Siri. "The AfD and its sympathisers: Finally a right-wing populist movement in Germany?." German Politics 24.2 (2015): 154-178 online.
 Diermeier, Matthias. "The AfD’s Winning Formula—No Need for Economic Strategy Blurring in Germany." Intereconomics 55.1 (2020): 43–52. online
 Franz, Christian, Marcel Fratzscher, and Alexander Kritikos. "At opposite poles: How the success of the Green Party and AfD reflects the geographical and social cleavages in Germany." DIW Weekly Report 9.34 (2019): 289–300. online
 Pfahl-Traughber, Armin (2019). Die AfD und der Rechtsextremismus: Eine Analyse aus politikwissenschaftlicher Perspektive. Springer VS, .
 Hansen, Michael A., and Jonathan Olsen. "Flesh of the same flesh: A study of voters for the alternative for Germany (AfD) in the 2017 federal election." German Politics 28.1 (2019): 1–19. online
 Havertz, Ralf. "Right-wing populism and neoliberalism in Germany: The AfD’s embrace of ordoliberalism." New Political Economy 24.3 (2019): 385–403.
 Küppers, Anne. "'Climate-Soviets,' 'Alarmism,' and 'Eco-Dictatorship': The Framing of Climate Change Scepticism by the Populist Radical Right Alternative for Germany." German Politics (2022) online.
  Rosellini, Jay. The German New Right: AfD, PEGIDA and the Re-Imagining of National Identity (Hurst, 2020) online review
 Spiegel Online's Guide to German Political Parties: Alternative for Germany

External links

 (in German)
Manifesto for Germany: The Political Programme for the Alternative for Germany (2017, English translation)

Alternative for Germany
Antisemitism in Germany
Counter-jihad
German nationalist political parties
Identitarian movement
Nationalist parties in Germany
National conservative parties
Anti-Islam political parties in Europe
Social conservative parties
Organizations that oppose LGBT rights
Right-wing populist parties
Right-wing populism in Germany
Eurosceptic parties in Germany
Criticism of feminism
Opposition to feminism
Opposition to same-sex marriage
Anti-immigration politics in Germany
Direct democracy parties
Climate change denial
Far-right political parties in Germany
Anti-Islam sentiment in Germany
Right-wing parties in Europe
2013 establishments in Germany
Conservative parties in Germany
Parties represented in the European Parliament
Political parties established in 2013